Barwis is a surname. Notable people with the surname include:

John H. Barwis, American philatelist
Richard Barwis (1601–1648), English politician